Primate is a special service area within the Rural Municipality of Eye Hill No. 382, Saskatchewan, Canada that held village status prior to 2016.

History 

Primate incorporated as a village on April 5, 1922. It restructured on December 31, 2015, relinquishing its village status in favour of becoming a special service area under the jurisdiction of the Rural Municipality of Eye Hill No. 382.

Demographics 

In the 2016 Census of Population conducted by Statistics Canada, Primate recorded a population of 52 living in 21 of its 24 total private dwellings, a  change from its 2011 population of 45.

See also 
List of communities in Saskatchewan
List of special service areas in Saskatchewan

References 

Eye Hill No. 382, Saskatchewan
Special service areas in Saskatchewan
Former villages in Saskatchewan
Populated places disestablished in 2015
Division No. 13, Saskatchewan